"Ordinary Girl" is a song by American singer and actress Miley Cyrus, performing as Hannah Montana – the alter ego of Miley Stewart – a character she plays on the Disney Channel television series Hannah Montana. It was released to Radio Disney on July 6, 2010 as the lead single for the fourth season of Hannah Montana. Lyrically, the track speaks about how Hannah Montana might be famous, but she is just an ordinary girl underneath. The song was later released on July 6, 2010 through digital distribution as the lead single from the soundtrack of the same title as the special title (Hannah Montana Forever) of the fourth and final season of the series.

Background and composition

"Ordinary Girl" was written by Toby Gad and Arama Brown, and was released as the lead single from Hannah Montana Forever. It premiered on Radio Disney on July 2, 2010 and was released on July 6, 2010 to all digital outlets. On October 15, 2010, the song was released as a CD single. It is featured in the second episode of Hannah Montana Forever (final season), "Hannah Montana to the Principal's Office". "Ordinary Girl" is a song with a length of two minutes and fifty-nine seconds.

Reception
Stephanie Bruzzese of CommonSenseMedia stated that the song's "solid, snappy guitar hook is backed by catchy percussive clapping and a chorus of cute young voices -- a set-up that sounds more suited to Miley's maturing vocals." The song debuted at ninety-eight on the US Hot Digital Songs chart for the week ending July 11, 2010, then peaked at #49 two weeks later. The song has also debuted at #91 on Billboards US Hot 100 on the week dated July 31, 2010. It spent two weeks at its peak, then fell off the chart.

Music video
Unlike other Hannah Montana music videos, "Ordinary Girl" is not a concert taping performance. Hannah in the video is also a model, and not Miley Cyrus, as Miley Cyrus refused to appear in the video. It premiered on July 2, 2010 and starts out in Montana's dressing room where she is getting ready for a concert. She uses her video camera to tape everything that goes on, leading up to her stepping onstage, where a screaming crowd is waiting. She waves, then hands the camera to a girl in the front row of the concert. The video then flashes to a school room where the girl has a party with her friends after receiving the camera, while shots from the Hannah Montana season 3 concert are playing on the chalk boards. The camera is then passed onto another girl who bumps into a boy who begins talking to her. R5 artists Riker and Ross Lynch are seen in the classroom.

Track listingsU.S. digital download"Ordinary Girl" (Album Version) – 2:57EU 2-Track CD Single'
"Ordinary Girl" (Album Version) – 2:57
"Ordinary Girl" (Instrumental) – 2:57

Charts

Certification

Release history

References

2010 songs
Hannah Montana songs
Songs from television series
Songs written by Toby Gad
Walt Disney Records singles